Mitrella tosatoi is a species of sea snail in the family Columbellidae, the dove snails.

Description
The length of the shell attains 26.3 mm.

Distribution
This marine species occurs off Martinique.

References

 Bouchet, P.; Fontaine, B. (2009). List of new marine species described between 2002-2006. Census of Marine Life

External links
 Monsecour D. & Monsecour K. (2006) Two new deep water species of Columbellidae (Gastropoda: Neogastropoda) from the Caribbean. Gloria Maris 45(1-2): 1-6.

tosatoi
Gastropods described in 2006